Milbridge is a town in Washington County, Maine, United States at the mouth of the Narraguagus River. The population was 1,375 at the 2020 census. The town was incorporated in 1848. It contains the villages of Milbridge and Wyman.

Geography

Demographics

As of 2020, the median income for a household in the town was $44,545.

2010 census
As of the census of 2010, there were 1,353 people, 612 households, and 345 families residing in the town. The racial makeup of the town was 95.1% White, 0.2% African American, 0.8% Native American, 0.1% Asian, 2.8% from other races, and 0.9% from two or more races. Hispanic or Latino of any race were 6.2% of the population.

There were 612 households, of which 23.2% had children under the age of 18 living with them, 45.4% were married couples living together, 7.4% had a female householder with no husband present, 3.6% had a male householder with no wife present, and 43.6% were non-families. 37.1% of all households were made up of individuals, and 20.7% had someone living alone who was 65 years of age or older. The average household size was 2.16 and the average family size was 2.79.

The median age in the town was 47.3 years. 19.1% of residents were under the age of 18; 6.8% were between the ages of 18 and 24; 21% were from 25 to 44; 29.3% were from 45 to 64; and 23.8% were 63 years of age or older. The gender makeup of the town was 48.2% male and 51.8% female.

Economy
The economy consists of people involved in agriculture, commercial fishing, retail and tourism.

Two of Milbridge's largest employers are Wyman's and Kelco.

Notable people 

 Katie Aselton, director and actress (The Puffy Chair filmed in Milbridge)—from Milbridge
 Gene Carter, federal judge—born in Milbridge
 Theodore Enslin (1925–2011), poet—resident of Milbridge
 Sue Hubbell, author—resident of Milbridge
 David J. Kennedy (1907–1995), Speaker of the Maine House of Representatives—native of Milbridge

References

External links
 

Towns in Washington County, Maine
Towns in Maine
Populated coastal places in Maine